{{DISPLAYTITLE:C3-Benzenes}}
The C3-benzenes are a class of organic aromatic compounds which contain a benzene ring and three other carbon atoms.
For the hydrocarbons with no further unsaturation, there are four isomers. The chemical formula for all the saturated isomers is C9H12.

There are three trimethylbenzenes, three ethylmetylbenzenes, and two propylbenzene isomers. Petrol (gasoline) can contain 3-4% C3-benzenes.

Trimethylbenzenes
Hemellitene
Pseudocumene
Mesitylene

Other

Saturated
1,2-Ethylmethylbenzene 	
1,3-Ethylmethylbenzene 	
1,4-Ethylmethylbenzene
Cumene
n-Propylbenzene

Unsaturated
trans-Propenylbenzene
4-Vinyltoluene

References

Alkylbenzenes
 
Benzene derivatives